The following museums and art galleries are located in Cambridge, England:

 Round Church Visitor Centre — History of the Round Church, the development of Cambridge and the university
 Cambridge Museum of Technology — Housed in the sewage pumping station, print room and old machines, local industries and equipment
 Cambridge Science Centre — Interactive museum of science and technology
 Cambridge University Library — Events held in the Exhibition Centre
 Cambridge University Museum of Zoology — University of Cambridge — Specimens and skeletons of fossils, animals, insects and birds from around the world
 Centre for Computing History — Museum telling the story of the Information Age
 Fitzwilliam Museum — University of Cambridge — Museum with collections of art, manuscripts, coins, medals, and antiquities
 Kettle's Yard — University of Cambridge Art gallery with collections of contemporary and modern art
 Lawrence Room at Girton College — features Anglo-Saxon, Egyptian and Mediterranean artefacts
 Museum of Archaeology and Anthropology — University of Cambridge Archaeological and anthropological artefacts and photographs from around the world, including a totem pole
 Museum of Cambridge — Museum of the history of Cambridge, Cambridgeshire, regional folklore and local life
 Museum of Classical Archaeology — University of Cambridge — Museum of plaster casts of classical Greek and Roman statues and sculpture
 New Hall Art Collection — Gallery and collection of modern and contemporary art by female artists
 People's Portraits Exhibition at Girton College — exhibition of the Royal Society of Portrait Painters showing 'ordinary' British people at the verge of the 21st century
 Ruskin Gallery — art gallery of Anglia Ruskin University
 The Polar Museum — University of Cambridge — Museum dedicated to the history and science of Arctic and Antarctic exploration
 Sedgwick Museum — University of Cambridge Museum of fossil animals and plants, dinosaurs, and rocks and minerals
 Whipple Museum of the History of Science — University of Cambridge Scientific instruments, models and displays on the history of science, dating from medieval times to the present day

See also
 List of museums in Cambridgeshire
 List of museums in Oxford
University of Cambridge Museums is a consortium of the eight museums of the University of Cambridge

External links

 Museums in Cambridge

Cambridge

Cambridge-related lists
Cambridge